John Bere was an Oxford college head in the 16th-century.

Fletcher was  educated at Exeter College, Oxford, graduating B.A. in 1517 and M.A. in 1520. He was appointed Fellow of Exeter in 1521; and was its  Rector from 1529 to 1531. A priest, he held the livings at Endellion and Camborne.

References

Alumni of Exeter College, Oxford
Rectors of Exeter College, Oxford
16th-century English people
Fellows of Exeter College, Oxford